Annis Lee Furness Wister (9 October 1830, Philadelphia - 15 November 1908, Philadelphia) was a translator who resided in the United States.  She specialized in translations from German to English.

Biography
She was the daughter of the Rev. William Henry Furness, by whom she was educated. Early in life, she began to translate stories from German. She married Dr. Caspar Wister in 1854. He was a descendant of Caspar Wistar, a glassmaker who came to the United States in 1717.  Dr. Wister died in 1888.  Annis Lee Wister made many translations of note. Her translations were issued in a uniform edition of 30 volumes in 1888.

Works
Among her translations are:

 Georg Blum and Ludwig Wahl, Seaside and Fireside Fairies (Philadelphia, 1864)
 E. Marlitt, The Old Mamselle's Secret (1868)
 ---, Gold Else (1868)
 E. Marlitt, The Countess Gisela (1860)
 E. Marlitt, The Little Moorland Princess (1873)
 E. Marlitt, The Second Wife (1874)
 Wilhelmine von Hillern, Only a Girl, or a Physician for the Soul (1870)
 Friedrich Wilhelm Hackländer, Enchanting and Enchanted (1871)
 Adeline von Volckhausen, Why Did He Not Die, Or, the Child from the Ebraergang  (1871)
 Adelheid von Auer, It Is the Fashion (1872)
 Fanny Lewald, Hulda; or, The Deliverer (1874)
 Golo Raimund, From hand to hand (1882)
With Frederic Henry Hedge, she published Metrical Translations and Poems (1888).

Notes

References

External links
 
 
 

1830 births
1908 deaths
German–English translators
Writers from Philadelphia
19th-century American translators
19th-century American women writers